Below is a list of the most notable deadliest maritime incidents or tragedies in the Philippines.

List of maritime incidents

  Data are based from the records of the Board of Marine Inquiry of the Philippine Coast Guard, unless taken and supported from other references.
  The death toll of 4,341 was only an estimate, which also includes the missing.

See also
 List of maritime disasters involving the Philippine Span Asia Carrier Corporation
 List of maritime disasters

References

External links

 Ships of the World Article
 Guinness Records Article
 DNV Annex 1 Passenger vessel Evacuation descriptions P36 
 Strings of Maritime Tragedies

 Ship Awry
 Safety in the High Seas
 Casualty Count
 Sulpicio Lines vessels in major marine mishaps

Shipwrecks in the Pacific Ocean
Ferries of the Philippines